David Beveridge was a Scottish professional footballer who played as a defender.

References

Year of birth missing
Year of death missing
Scottish footballers
Association football defenders
Albion Rovers F.C. players
Burnley F.C. players
Grimsby Town F.C. players
English Football League players